Carl Lee "Butch" Glass (February 26, 1898 – October 19, 1972) was an American baseball pitcher in the Negro leagues. He played from 1923 to 1930 with several teams, playing mostly for the Memphis Red Sox.

References

External links
 and Baseball-Reference Black Baseball stats and Seamheads

1898 births
1972 deaths
Birmingham Black Barons players
Memphis Red Sox players
Kansas City Monarchs players
Louisville White Sox players
Chicago American Giants players
Baseball players from Lexington, Kentucky
20th-century African-American sportspeople
Baseball pitchers